Judy Dan (born September 9, 1930) is a retired Chinese-American actress.

Biography

Judy Dan was born in Shanghai on September 9, 1930, the daughter of film director Dan Duyu and actress Yin Mingzhu. She 
was raised in Hong Kong. She worked for Cathay Pacific where she was talent spotted. In 1952, she won the Miss Hong Kong Pageant, then known as the Miss Hong Kong Beauty Contest, and was third runner-up at the Miss Universe 1952 contest. Her participation and finish in the Miss Universe competition brought her a contract with 20th Century Fox film studio. She changed her surname to "Dan" at some point.

Other
Dan studied drama at George Pepperdine College and appeared in three plays during her two-and-one-half years there.

Personal life
Dan married Tom Woo, an architect in West Los Angeles; the couple had three daughters.

Filmography

References

External links
 
 Let's remember Judy Dan, chinarhyming.com, January 5, 2016; accessed January 18, 2018.

1930 births
20th-century Chinese actresses
Actresses from Shanghai
Chinese emigrants to the United States
Hong Kong film actresses
Living people
Miss Universe 1952 contestants
Pepperdine University alumni